Dasht-e Kuch-e Bala (also Romanized as Dasht-e Kūch-e Bālā; also known as Dasht-e Kūch, Dasht-i-Kūch, Dasht Kooch, and Dasht Kūch) is a village in Dowlatabad Rural District, in the Central District of Jiroft County, Kerman Province, Iran. At the 2006 census, its population was 337, in 90 families.

References 

Populated places in Jiroft County